The East Rugby League  (East RL) is a tier 5 amateur rugby league competition structure with sides from the East of England. It was previously the East Division of the Rugby League Conference, which was set up in 1997.

Structure

The East Rugby League consists of three divisions of competition. Premier, Division 1 and Entry league.

The East Premier was set up for the 2013 season with an East Entry League below this for emerging clubs and second teams. 2013 is also the inaugural year for the East Cup. The competition operates for all tier 4 clubs in the Eastern Counties of England. (Bedfordshire, Cambridgeshire, Essex, Hertfordshire, Norfolk & Suffolk)

In 2014, a new division between the Premier and Entry level was formed and named East Division 1. It provides a more structured level for teams who cannot compete with the standard of the established East Premier. Promotion and relegation between the two competitions begins in 2015.

History

The Rugby League Conference was founded in 1997 as the Southern Conference, a 10-team pilot league for teams in the South of England and the English Midlands. The initial line-up of divisions included an Eastern Division and this has been a feature of the Conference ever since.

The Premier Divisions were set up in 2005 for teams who had achieved a certain playing standard and were able to travel further afield to find stronger opposition.

The Eastern Division became the East Division in 2009.

The RFL restructured amateur rugby league in 2012 and the Eastern region became rebranded as the "East RL"

Community game pyramid

 National Conference League
 Conference League South
 East Premier League
 East Division 1
 East Entry League

The East Merit League is the lowest level on the pyramid for clubs in the East of England.

Representative Side

From 2015, the East will have a representative side at the end of each season. The side will be made up of the best players from clubs within the East RL. They are likely to play other representative sides from other regions as well as services such as the Police, Fire brigade, Army etc.

Participating teams by season

Eastern Division (1997-2008)

1997: Bedford Swifts, Ipswich Rhinos, Kingston, North London Skolars, West London
1998: Bedford Swifts, Cambridge Eagles, Ipswich Rhinos, Northampton (failed to start season), South Norfolk Saints
1999: Bedford Swifts, Cambridge Eagles, Hemel Stags, Ipswich Rhinos, South Norfolk Saints
2000: Bedford Swifts, Cambridge Eagles, Hemel Stags, Ipswich Rhinos, South Norfolk Saints, St Albans Centurions
2001: Bedford Swifts, Cambridge Eagles, Ipswich Rhinos, South Norfolk Saints, St Albans Centurions
2002: Bedford Swifts, Cambridge Eagles, Ipswich Rhinos, Luton Vipers, St Albans Centurions
2003: Cambridge Eagles, Essex Eels, Ipswich Rhinos, Luton Vipers, South Norfolk Saints, St Ives Roosters
2004: Cambridge Eagles, Hemel Stags 'A', Ipswich Rhinos, Luton Vipers, Middlesex Lions, North London Skolars 'A', South Norfolk Saints, St Ives Roosters
2005: Bedford Tigers, Cambridge Eagles, Luton Vipers 'A', South Norfolk Saints, St Albans Centurions 'A', St Ives Roosters (Luton Vipers A failed to complete the season)
2006: Bedford Tigers, Cambridge Eagles, Colchester Romans, South Norfolk Saints, St Ives Roosters (Northampton failed to start the season)
2007: Bedford Tigers, Cambridge Eagles, Colchester Romans, Greenwich Admirals, St Ives Roosters, Thetford Titans
2008: Cambridge Eagles, Colchester Romans, Greenwich Admirals, Hainault Bulldogs, Northampton Casuals, St Ives Roosters, Thetford Titans

East Division (2009-2011)

2009: Bury Titans, Cambridge Eagles, Colchester Romans, Hainault Bulldogs A, St Ives Roosters, Northampton Casuals, Norwich City Saxons (Cambridge Eagles and Hainault Bulldogs A failed to complete the season)
2010: Bedford Tigers, Bury Titans, Northampton Casuals, Norwich City Saxons, St Albans Centurions A, St Ives Roosters (St Albans Centurions A failed to complete the season)
2011: Bedford Tigers, Bury Titans, Northampton Demons A, Norwich City Saxons, St Ives Roosters, Sudbury Gladiators (Northampton Demons A and Norwich City Saxons failed to complete the season)

East RL (2012- )

East Premier League
2012: Bedford Tigers, Bury Titans, King's Lynn Black Knights, Milton Keynes Wolves, North Herts Crusaders, St Ives Roosters
2013: Bedford Tigers, King's Lynn Black Knights, Milton Keynes Wolves, North Herts Crusaders, St Ives Roosters (Stowmarket Titans failed to complete the season)
2014: Bedford Tigers, King's Lynn Black Knights, Milton Keynes Wolves, North Herts Crusaders, Southend Spartans, St Ives Roosters
2015: Bedford Tigers, King's Lynn Black Knights, Milton Keynes Wolves, North Herts Crusaders, St Albans Centurions, St Ives Roosters
2016: Bedford Tigers, Brentwood Eels, Hemel Stags (community), NH Crusaders, St Albans Centurions, St Ives Roosters

East Division 1
2014: Bedford Tigers 'A', Brentwood Eels, Cambridge Lions, North Herts Crusaders 'A'
NB: Bovingdon Bulldogs failed to start the season and were replaced by North Herts Crusaders 'A'
2015: Brentwood Eels, Cambridge Lions, North Herts Knights, Southend Spartans
2016: Breckland Spartans, Cambridge Lions, King's Lynn Black Knights, MK Wolves, Southend Spartans

East Entry League
2012: Bedford Tigers 'A', Hemel Stags 'A', North Herts Crusaders 'A', St Albans Centurions 'A'
2013: Bedford Tigers 'A', Cambridge Lions, North Herts Crusaders 'A', St Ives Roosters 'A', Wymondham Trojans
2014: Did not run (Bedford Tigers 'B', North Herts Crusaders 'A' and St Ives Roosters 'A' were scheduled to participate but North Herts Crusaders 'A' joined division 1 and the other 2 teams folded)
2015: Bedford Tigers 'A', Cambridge Lions 'A', Milton Keynes Wolves (after dropping out of premier division), St Albans Centurions 'A'

Winners

East Rugby League champions

As Rugby League Conference Eastern Division

1997 North London Skolars (now London Skolars)
1998 South Norfolk Saints (now Bury Titans)
1999 Ipswich Rhinos (now Eastern Rhinos)
2000 Hemel Stags
2001 Ipswich Rhinos (now Eastern Rhinos) 
2002 Luton Vipers
2003 South Norfolk Saints (now Bury Titans)
2004 Ipswich Rhinos (now Eastern Rhinos)
2005 St Albans Centurions 'A'
2006 Bedford Tigers (Beat St Ives Roosters)
2007 Bedford Tigers (Beat St Ives Roosters)
2008 Hainault Bulldogs

As Rugby League Conference East Division

2009 Northampton Casuals (Beat Bury Titans)
2010 Northampton Demons
2011 Sudbury Gladiators (Beat Bury Titans)

As East RL Premier League

2012 North Herts Crusaders (Beat St Ives Roosters)
2013 North Herts Crusaders (Beat St Ives Roosters)
2014 St Ives Roosters (Beat Bedford Tigers)
2015 Bedford Tigers (Beat St Ives Roosters)
2016 Hemel Stags (Beat Bedford Tigers)
2017 Hemel Stags (Beat Bedford Tigers)
2018 North Herts Crusaders (Beat Bedford Tigers)
2019 Brentwood Eels (Beat St Ives Roosters 18-16)
2020 (Uncontested due to Covid-19) 
2021 Brentwood Eels (Beat Bedford Tigers A 40-18)

East RL Division 1
2014 Brentwood Eels
2015 Brentwood Eels
2016 MK Wolves
2017 Luton Vipers
2018 North Herts Knights
2019 (Uncontested)
2020 (Uncontested)
2021

East RL Entry League
2013 Bedford Tigers "A"
2014 N/A 
2015 Hemel Stags "A"
2016 Bedford Tigers "A"
2017 Discontinued

East RL Community Challenge Cup
2013 North Herts Crusaders (Beat Bedford Tigers)
2014 North Herts Crusaders (Beat Bedford Tigers)
2015 Bedford Tigers (Beat King's Lynn Black Knights 46-4) - MOM Paul Ryder
2016 Bedford Tigers (Beat Hemel Stags 22-16) MOM Sam Richbell
2017 Bedford Tigers (St Albans Centurions 38-12)
2018 Bedford Tigers (NH Crusaders 24-14) - MOM Ollie Peters
2019 St Albans Centurions (Brentwood Eels 30-28) - MOM Kristian Naylor
2020 (Uncontested due to Covid-19)
2021 Brentwood Eels (St Albans Centurions 9-4) - MOM Lawrence Haywood

East RL Community Challenge Shield
2013 St Ives Roosers (Beat MK Wolves)
2014 King's Lynn Black Knights (Beat Brentwood Eels)
2015 St Ives Roosters (Beat NH Crusaders)
2016 Brentwood Eels (Beat NH Crusaders)
2017 NH Crusaders  (Beat Hemel Stags)
2018 St Ives Roosters (Southend Sharks unable to attend match)
2019 (Uncontested)
2020 (Covid-19)
2021 (Covid-19)
2022 Canvey Knights (Beat NH Knights) 22-18 (Player of the Match Brett Smith 'Canvey Knights')

East RL Community Challenge Vase
2015 Southend Spartans (Beat NH Knights)
2016 King's Lynn Black Knights (Beat Eastern Rhinos "A")
2017 Luton Vipers (Beat Hemel Stags "A")
2018 NOT CONTESTED
2019 NOT CONTESTED

East RL 9's Festival
2013 King's Lynn Black Knights
2014 MK Wolves
2015 Bedford Tigers
2016 Bedford Tigers
2017 St Albans Centurions
2018 NH Crusaders
2019 Bedford Tigers
2020 (Uncontested due to Covid-19)

External links
 Official RLC website

Rugby League Conference
Sports leagues established in 1997
1997 establishments in England